Lilla is a female given name, derived from Elizabeth.

Given name
 Lilla Barzó, a Hungarian tennis player
 Lilla Bodor, a Hungarian painter
 Lilla Brignone, an Italian film and theater actress
 Lilla Cabot Perry, an American artist
 Lilla Crawford, an American actress
 Lilla Hansen, a  Norwegian architect
 Lilla Maldura, an Italian artist
 Lilla Nagy, a Hungarian footballer
 Lilla Sipos, a Hungarian footballer
 Lilla Vincze, a Hungarian singer
 Lilla Watson, an indigenous Australian artist
 Lilla Zuckerman, an American television writer

Surname
 Mark Lilla, an American political scientist.

Nickname
 Iris Mary 'Lilla' Birtwistle, an English lyric poet and gallery owner

See also
 Lila (given name)

References 

English feminine given names
Italian feminine given names
Hebrew feminine given names